The Charles E. Smith Center is a 5,000-seat multipurpose arena in the United States' capital, Washington, D.C. Opened on November 17, 1975, it is home to the George Washington University Colonials men's and women's basketball teams, as well as the university's swimming, water polo, gymnastics, and volleyball teams. From 2014 to 2018, it was the home of the Washington Kastles of World TeamTennis. Smith Center also became the temporary home of the Washington Mystics as they made a run at a WNBA Championship in 2018. Smith Center is located on the main George Washington campus in Foggy Bottom, on the block bounded by 22nd and 23rd and F and G Streets NW. The arena also has hosted concerts and includes practice courts, a swimming pool, a weight room, and athletic department offices.

The building was named for Charles E. Smith, who was a university trustee and chairman of the Committee on University Development.

A $43 million update and expansion of the Smith Center began in February 2008, due in part to a $10 million gift from the family of Charles E. Smith. Renovations were finished before the start of the 2010-2011 Basketball season. Improvements include:
New team locker rooms
A new seating chart for students and Athletic Director's Club members
The Colonials Club
New scoreboards
A new exterior design
A new entranceway
A new ticket booth

On September 11, 2018, the Smith Center's Jumbotron collapsed onto the court below while undergoing maintenance. No one was injured in the incident, possibly due to the Jumbotron's already-lowered position before the fall.

Events
PFL 3, a mixed martial arts event was held at the arena on July 5, 2018.

See also 
 List of NCAA Division I basketball arenas

References

External links
George Washington University Official Athletic Site - Facilities

Basketball venues in Washington, D.C.
College basketball venues in the United States
College gymnastics venues in the United States
College swimming venues in the United States
College volleyball venues in the United States
Foggy Bottom
George Washington Colonials basketball venues
Gymnastics venues in Washington, D.C.
Mixed martial arts venues in Washington, D.C.
Swimming venues in Washington, D.C.
Tennis venues in Washington, D.C.
Volleyball venues in Washington, D.C.
World TeamTennis stadiums
1975 establishments in Washington, D.C.